The 1920 Iowa Hawkeyes football team represented the University of Iowa as a member of the Big Ten Conference during the 1920 college football season. Led by fifth-year head coach Howard Jones, the Hawkeyes compiled an overall record of 5–2 with a mark of 3–2 in conference play, placing fifth in the Big Ten. The team played home games at Iowa Field in Iowa City, Iowa.

Schedule

References

Iowa
Iowa Hawkeyes football seasons
Iowa Hawkeyes football